Grant Parker (born 29 October 1960) is a New Zealand wrestler. He competed in the men's freestyle 90 kg at the 1992 Summer Olympics.

References

1960 births
Living people
New Zealand male sport wrestlers
Olympic wrestlers of New Zealand
Wrestlers at the 1992 Summer Olympics
People from Carterton, New Zealand